Atif Qureshi Bashir (born 3 April 1985) is an ex-professional football player, whose career came to an end due to extensive knee injuries over the past three years. His latest club football was with Dinas Powys and at international level for the Pakistan national team.

Club career

Early career
Born to a German-Turkish mother and British-Pakistani father, Bashir is a defender who is equally comfortable playing at right-back, in the centre of defence, Bashir spent seven years as a youth at professional clubs such as Hertha Berlin and Cardiff City.

Welsh football
After leaving Cardiff City, Bashir signed for Afan Lido in 2004 and played 11 games scoring 1 goal for the club. After one season with Lido, he went to Maesteg Park A.F.C. in 2005 and spent one season playing 32 games and scoring two goals. He then went to Cardiff Grange Quins in 2007, making eight appearances in the Welsh Premier League, scoring one goal. He had a short spell at the Welsh Premier League team Haverfordwest County A.F.C. and then moved to Barry Town, where he impressed and became a fans' favourite, also becoming Barry's first international player, making headlines and appearing 45 times and scoring five goals for the club. He later on made a move to Bridgend Town in 2010 but in the same year he returned to Barry Town.

English trials
In July 2010, Bashir had a trial with English Conference National side Luton Town.  He impressed the fans in a pre-season friendly match against Dunstable Town, but he was surprisingly not offered a contract by Luton Town manager Richard Money.

In August 2010, he had a trial with another English Conference National side, Histon, playing in a pre-season friendly match against Dagenham & Redbridge. A transfer to Histon looked set to happen, but Histon manager John Beck resigned shortly after Bashir's trial, so he returned to Barry Town for the start of the 2010–11 season.

In October 2010, and then again in November 2010, Bashir undertook trial spells with Conference North outfit AFC Telford United.

Bashir undertook a trial spell with Conference National side Newport County in July 2011, featuring in a pre-season friendly match against Mangotsfield United.

University of Glamorgan Football
In September 2011, Bashir was awarded a full university football scholarship and has since been involved in all games in the BUCS premier league representing his University at the highest level in England and wales.

Barry Town
Bashir stills plays for Barry town football club, still being a fans favourite to this day. During the 2012–13 season, whilst playing against his former team Haverfordwest, he sustained an injury which put him out for the rest of the season and possibly the rest of the 2013–14 season.

At the beginning of the 2014-15 season, Bashir returned to game action for Barry Town. After a few games with the club, he departed from the club and joined local rivals, Dinas Powys.

International career
Akhtar Mohiuddin has stated that "...born to a British-Pakistani father and a Turkish German mother, Atif could have theoretically played for Germany, Turkey, or any of the British Home Nations, as well as Pakistan whom he eventually chose. He made his debut for Pakistan in the 2008 SAFF Championship against the host Maldives, followed by matches against India and Nepal".

In 2008, Bashir was called up to represent Pakistan. Although initially part of the 2008 AFC Challenge Cup squad, he could not join the team because his Pakistani passport had not been issued. A few months later, Bashir made his International Debut for Pakistan in the 2008 SAFF Championship against the Maldives, before facing India and Nepal in the first round. 

In October 2010, he was also included as one of three overage players in an under-23 Pakistan squad for the 2010 Asian Games in China, where Pakistan faced Thailand, Maldives and Oman in November 2010.

In March 2011, Bashir represented Pakistan in their unsuccessful 2012 AFC Challenge Cup qualifying campaign, appearing at the heart of the defence alongside Zesh Rehman in defeats to Turkmenistan and India.  However, he helped Pakistan to victory in their final match, scoring the second goal in a 2–0 win over Chinese Taipei at the MBPJ Stadium with a long-range strike that saw Pakistan finish third in Group B.

He continued to cement his place as a regular in the Pakistan national side, featuring in both legs of the 2014 World Cup qualifiers against Bangladesh in June and July 2011.

References

1985 births
Living people
Pakistani footballers
Association football midfielders
Pakistan international footballers
Barry Town United F.C. players
Haverfordwest County A.F.C. players
Afan Lido F.C. players
Bridgend Town A.F.C. players
Footballers at the 2010 Asian Games
Footballers from Berlin
British Asian footballers
Maesteg Park A.F.C. players
Asian Games competitors for Pakistan
Dinas Powys F.C. players
Cardiff Grange Harlequins A.F.C. players